Taheruddin Thakur (died 17 February 2009) was a Bangladeshi politician. He served as the Minister of State for Information at the cabinet of President Sheikh Mujibur Rahman.

Career
Thakur was arrested on 14 August 1996 for the charge of assassination of Sheikh Mujibur Rahman which took place on 15 August 1975. He was acquitted from the case later. On 20 October 2004, Metropolitan Sessions Judge's Court (Trial Court) acquitted Thakur from another charge of Jail Killing case.

Thakur worked as a journalist at The Daily Ittefaq. He died on 17 February 2009 after suffering from kidney disease.

References

2009 deaths
Bangladeshi journalists
Assassination of Sheikh Mujibur Rahman
State Ministers of Information (Bangladesh)
1st Jatiya Sangsad members
Bangladesh Krishak Sramik Awami League central committee members
People from Sarail Upazila